The election was held on 9 May 1968, with a third of the council up for vote, alongside three double vacancies in Broomhill, Handsworth and Mosborough. Overall turnout was 33.9%, a continuation of the preceding year's improvement.

Following on from the previous year's momentous wins by the Conservatives, this historic night seen them surpass those and win control of the council for the first time since 1932, when it won as the Conservative-Liberal combination Progressives party. This election and the previous followed the national trend of Labour suffering massive losses around the country, even in their heartlands, with only two cities left Labour-controlled after these elections - Hull and Stoke - and even there the Tories were making significant inroads.

The results were met with jubilant scenes in the town hall, where the Conservatives opened bottles of champagne and celebrated. The leader of the Conservative group, alderman Harold Hebblethwaite, remarked:

"Tonight is a wonderful night. It is a narrow majority, nevertheless, it is a workable majority. This victory is the plum which the Conservative Party have been looking for nationally, and here it is. I am not used to making emotional statements such as 'to the victors the spoils' but it follows naturally from our victory that we shall take the committee chairmanships and deputy chairmanships. We will have to do that to control policy. We have a majority of only four but I would emphasise that if we had had this majority last year with the opportunity to manipulate aldermanic seats our majority on the council floor would have been 14."

Labour Park councillor Joe Ashton, wrote "we will return" on the wall of the Town Hall whip's office in response to the defeat.

The Conservatives gained seven seats from Labour in Birley, Darnall, Firth Park, Netherthorpe, Owlerton, Sharrow and Walkley, as well as the sole Independent seat in Mosborough. These gains transformed a narrow deficit in councillors, to a thirteen-strong majority. A poll of voters in the Darnall ward (an invariably Labour-won seat since 1945) was commissioned by the Morning Telegraph four days prior to the election, correctly predicting a Conservative gain with a swing to the Conservatives of 5.5% - a figure that was exceeded by one percent on the night. Unfortunately for the Conservatives, the aldermanic elections weren't until 1970, and two-thirds of those currently represented Labour, reducing their majority to just 4, and as such, difficult to govern with. Aside from numerical difficulties, the recent report from the City's Treasurer precipitated financial restraint, so the incoming governments options were one of either cuts to the council's services, or rises in the city's rates.

Election result

The result had the following consequences for the total number of seats on the Council after the elections:

Ward results

References

Sheffield City Council election
1968
City Council election, 1968
Sheffield City Council election